Store Austanbotntind (official form on maps Store Austanbotntinden) is a mountain on the border of the municipalities of Luster and Årdal in Vestland county, Norway. It is the highest peak in the western part of the Hurrungane mountain range. The easiest route to the summit involves climbing, though relatively easy, and crossing of an exposed snow flank.

Name
The first element is the name of the valley Austanbotnen and the last element is the finite form of tind which means "mountain peak".  The name of the valley is a compound of austan which means "eastern" and the finite form of botn which means "bottom" or "end of a valley".

See also
List of mountains of Norway

References

Luster, Norway
Mountains of Vestland
Jotunheimen